McClintock/Apache Blvd is a station on the Metro light rail line in Tempe, Arizona, United States. A park and ride facility is in the garage attached to apartment complex on southeast corner.

Ridership

References

External links
 Valley Metro map

Valley Metro Rail stations
Railway stations in the United States opened in 2008
2008 establishments in Arizona
Buildings and structures in Tempe, Arizona